Sebastián Sepúlveda (born 1972) is a Chilean screenwriter, film producer, editor and director.

Life and career
Sepúlveda was born in Concepción, Chile. He lived the first 18 years of his life between Europe and South America due to his family's exile from Chile during the military regime. On return to Santiago in 1990, he began studying history. Towards the end of the 1990s Sepúlveda studied at two prestigious film schools, La Fémis in Paris (screenwriting) and Escuela Internacional de Cine y Televisión, San Antonio de los Baños, Cuba (editing) and began creating his first short films.

He was involved in editing and writing a number of films in the 2000s, including Young and Wild (2012).

Sepúlveda's directorial debut was the documentary O Areal (The Sandpit), about the Guajará community in Brazil’s Amazon rainforest.

Sepúlveda received funding from Fonds Sud cinema (managed by France's Institut Français) to create his next film as director, The Quispe Girls.
The film was based on the true story of the Quispe sisters who died in mysterious circumstances in 1974 and stars Catalina Saavedra as well as Digna Quispe, the niece of one of the Quispe sisters. The Quispe Girls won the audience's award at the FILMAR Festival of Latin American film and also screened at the Venice Film Festival.

FilmographyCine Chile database Sebastián Sepúlveda Filmography  Cinechile, Enciclopedia del Cine Chileno / Santiago, Chile , By Gabriela González F. - retrieved on December 21, 2014

Director
 The Quispe Girls, 2013
 O Areal (The Sandpit), documentary, 2008

Screenwriter
 The Quispe Girls, 2013
 Young and Wild, 2012
 Grado 3, 2009
 Maria y el Nuevo Mundo, documentary, 2009
 O Areal (The Sandpit), documentary, 2008

Editor
 Spencer, 2021
 Lisey's Story (series), 2021
 Ema (film), 2019
 Chicuarotes, 2019
 Jackie (2016)
 El Club, 2015
 Young and Wild, 2012
 Ulysses, 2011
 The Year of the Tiger, 2011
 Maria y el Nuevo Mundo, documentary, 2009
 O Areal (The Sandpit), documentary, 2008
 The crime of Zacarias Barrientos, documentary, 2008
 La León, 2007
 Ralco, documentary, 1999
 Sensibile Short, 1998

Producer
 O Areal (The Sandpit), documentary, 2008
 Jo jo jo'', short, 1996

See also
 Cinema of Chile
 Latin American cinema
 Cinema of the world
 World cinema

References

Chilean film directors
Living people
Chilean screenwriters
Male screenwriters
1972 births
People from Concepción, Chile